The France women's national volleyball team represents France in international women's volleyball competitions and friendly matches. It is governed by the French Volleyball Federation.

Results

Olympic Games
 Champions   Runners up   Third place   Fourth place

World Championship

 Champions   Runners up   Third place   Fourth place

FIVB World Grand Prix
 2017 — 27th

FIVB Volleyball Women's Challenger Cup
 2018 — did not qualify
 2019 — did not qualify
 2022 — 5th place

European Championship
1991 — 9th place (tied)
1993 — did not qualify
1995 — did not qualify
1997 — did not qualify
1999 — did not qualify
2001 — 8th place
2003 — did not qualify
2005 — did not qualify
2007 — 8th place
2009 — 14th place (tied)
2011 — 10th place
2013 — 8th place
2015 — did not qualify
2017 — did not qualify
2019 — 21st place
2021 — 7th place
2023 — Qualified

European League
Champions: 2022

Team

Current squad
The following is the France roster in the 2021 Women's European Volleyball Championship

Head coach: Émile Rousseaux

2001 European Championship — 8th place
Lauranne Dautais, Karine Havas, Virginie Kadjo, Sandra Kociniewski, Laure Koenig, Séverine Lienard, Sylvie Lopes, Kinga Maculewicz, Karine Salinas, Virginie Sarpaux, Séverine Szewczyk, and Sandra Urios. Head Coach: Jue Gang-Bai.
2007 European Championship — 8th place
Christina Bauer, Alexia Djilali, Armelle Faesch, Sandra Kociniewski, Jelena Lozancic, Estelle Querard, Victoria Ravva, Alexandra Rochelle, Anna Rybaczewski, Karine Salinas, Hélène Schleck, Leslie Turiaf. Head coach: Yan Fang.
2009 European Championship — 14th place
Véronika Hudima, Félicia Menara, Christina Bauer, Amandine Mauricette, Pauline Soullard, Anna Rybaczewski, Maëva Orlé, Armelle Faesch, Déborah Ortschitt, Alexia Djilali, Séverine Liénard, Séverine Szewczyk, Estelle Quérard, Jelena Lozančić. Head coach: Fabrice Vial.
2011 European Championship — 10th place
Pauline Soullard, Véronika Hudima, Taiana Téré, Christina Bauer, Alexandra Rochelle, Jelena Lozančić, Anna Rybaczewski, Maëva Orlé, Armelle Faesch, Mallory Steux, Julie Mollinger, Hélène Schleck, Alexandra Dascalu, Marielle Bousquet. Head coach: Fabrice Vial.

See also
France men's national volleyball team

References
 French Volleyball Federation

National women's volleyball teams
Volleyball in France
Women's national sports teams of France